Parargina is a subtribe of butterflies of the subfamily Satyrinae.

Genera
 Chonala Moore, 1893
 Kirinia Moore, 1893
 Lasiommata Westwood, 1849
 Lopinga Moore, 1893
 Nosea Koiwaya, 1993
 Nosea hainanensis Koiwaya, 1993
 Orinoma Gray, 1846
 Pararge Hübner, 1819
 Rhaphicera Butler, 1867
 Tatinga Moore, 1893
 Tatinga thibetana (Oberthür 1876)

References

Satyrini
Lepidoptera subtribes